John Greaves (born 23 February 1950) is a British bass guitarist, pianist and composer who was a member of Henry Cow and has collaborated with Peter Blegvad. He was also a member of progressive rock band National Health and jazz-rock supergroup Soft Heap, and has recorded several solo albums, including Accident (1982), Parrot Fashions (1984), The Caretaker (2001) and Greaves Verlaine (2008).

Biography
Greaves was born in Prestatyn and grew up in Wrexham in northeast Wales. At the age of 12, he was given a bass guitar by his father, a Welsh dancehall bandleader, and within six months, he was playing in his father's orchestra. He continued playing in the orchestra for four years, during which time its varied musical styles gave Greaves valuable musician and arranger skills. He was educated at Grove Park Grammar School in Wrexham from 1961 to 1968.

In 1968, Greaves entered Pembroke College, Cambridge to study English, and at Cambridge, he met members of the burgeoning English avant-rock group Henry Cow in 1969. The band had been established the previous year by fellow Cambridge students Fred Frith and Tim Hodgkinson and had undergone numerous personnel changes up to that point. They were looking for a bassist and after several months of persuading, Greaves joined the band in October 1969. After juggling his time with the band and his studies, Greaves completed his Master of Arts degree in 1971. By the end of 1971, Henry Cow settled into a permanent core of Frith, Hodgkinson, Greaves and Chris Cutler. Greaves remained with the band until March 1976, toured Europe extensively with them (with his wife Sarah doing the sound-mix at many of their concerts), and appeared on five of their albums (including two with Slapp Happy). Greaves also contributed several compositions to the band's repertoire, including "Half Asleep; Half Awake", recorded on their second album, Unrest (1974).
In November 1973, Greaves (and other members of Henry Cow) participated in a live-in-the-studio performance of Mike Oldfield's Tubular Bells for the BBC. 

Greaves left Henry Cow to work on a project, Kew. Rhone. with Slapp Happy's Peter Blegvad in New York City. Greaves had met and worked with Blegvad during the brief merger of Henry Cow and Slapp Happy between November 1974 and April 1975, their first collaboration, "Bad Alchemy", appearing on the two bands' joint album Desperate Straights. Kew. Rhone. was a song cycle with all the music composed by Greaves and the lyrics written by Blegvad. In addition to bass guitar, Greaves also played keyboards and sang. The album was released in 1977 and credited to Greaves, Blegvad and Lisa Herman, the lead vocalist. It was well-received by critics: AllMusic described it as "An unfortunately neglected masterpiece of '70s progressive rock ..."; and Robert Wyatt reportedly liked it so much he bought two copies "just in case the first got worn out!"

After Kew. Rhone. Greaves returned to England to work in theatre as a composer, arranger and actor. In early 1978 he joined National Health and remained with them until the band split up in 1980. He toured with the band, appearing on the album Of Queues and Cures, for which he wrote the instrumental tour-de-force "Squarer for Maud", the later reunion effort DS Al Coda (1982) and the archive release Play Time. During this time (1979–88) he also performed with a free-improvising group, Soft Heap with Elton Dean from Soft Machine, Pip Pyle from National Health, and maverick guitarist Mark Hewins.

In the early 1980s, Greaves began a series of solo projects and collaborations. Having secured a deal with independent French-American label Europa Records, he recorded his first solo album, Accident in Paris in 1981–82. He moved to France permanently in 1984, and formed a touring band with François Ovide (guitar and trombone), Denis van Hecke from Aksak Maboul (cello), Mireille Bauer (formerly of Gong) (stand-up drums and percussion) and Blegvad's brother, Kristoffer Blegvad (backing vocals). This line-up also featured on Greaves's second solo album, Parrot Fashions (1984). During this time he also recorded and/or toured with the Penguin Cafe Orchestra and the Michael Nyman Band. He reunited with Peter Blegvad again on The Lodge project (alongside Kristoffer Blegvad, Jakko Jakszyk and Anton Fier) which produced an album, Smell of a Friend in 1987 (but only ever made a couple of attempts at performing live).

For his next album, 1991's La Petite Bouteille de Linge (Little Bottle of Laundry), Greaves retained the services of Ovide on guitar, adding his old mate Pip Pyle on drums and the latter's then-partner, Sophia Domancich on piano. Over the next few years his music took on a more acoustic flavour and Greaves eventually settled on a drum-less line-up comprising Domancich, Ovide (now on acoustic guitar exclusively) and double bass player Paul Rogers (bassist). This resulted in the 1995 album Songs, which consisted largely of acoustic arrangements of songs from his previous efforts, going back to Kew.Rhone. Greaves himself only handled lead vocals on one track, "The Green Fuse" (based on a Dylan Thomas poem), leaving the spotlight to Robert Wyatt, opera singer Susan Belling, Kristoffer Blegvad and French variety singer Caroline Loeb. During the 1990s, Greaves also embarked on one-off collaborations with David Cunningham from The Flying Lizards, on 1991's greaves, cunningham album, and Peter Blegvad on 1995's Unearthed. He also played bass in Blegvad's own trio alongside Chris Cutler on drums, which recorded two studio albums, later expanding into a quintet with Bob Drake on guitar and Karen Mantler on organ.

In the early 2000s Greaves chose to divide his time between two contrasting bands, an electric trio named Roxongs with François Ovide on guitar (later replaced by Patrice Meyer then Jef Morin) and Manu Denizet on drums, heard on 2001's The Caretaker, and an acoustic trio named Jazzsongs, with Sophia Domancich on piano and Vincent Courtois on cello, heard on 2003's The Trouble With Happiness, once again a mixture of old and new songs, but this time with Greaves himself singing all the way through.

Originally intended as a follow-up of sorts to the acclaimed Songs, 2004's Chansons saw Greaves team up with lyricist Christophe Glockner and vocalist Elise Caron for a collection of all-new songs with predominantly acoustic instrumentation, including guest spots by Robert Wyatt and Louis Sclavis.

During the same period, Greaves appeared as the featured vocalist on a number of projects. He contributed lyrics and vocals to two songs on saxophonist Julien Lourau's acclaimed Fire & Forget (2005), to much of Sophia Domancich's Snakes & Ladders (2010) sharing the microphone with Himiko Paganotti and Robert Wyatt, and sang all the vocals on Alain Blésing's Songs From The Beginning project, revisiting 1970s progressive rock classics by King Crimson, Soft Machine, Henry Cow and Hatfield and the North among others, Catherine Delaunay's Sois Patient Car Le Loup (2011), the French clarinettist's settings of texts by Malcolm Lowry, and Post Image's In an English Garden (2012), a special project celebrating the jazz-fusion group's 25th anniversary. Having had two of his songs used by the Daniel Yvinec-led edition of the Orchestre National de Jazz's tribute to Robert Wyatt, Greaves fulfilled a lifelong dream by fronting the ONJ at the legendary Theatre du Chatelet in Paris in January 2011, singing several Billie Holiday songs either solo or alongside Sandra Nkaké.

In 2005, Greaves released an album under the banner Maman with Jef Morin and Morin's partner in Les Recycleurs de Bruits, Nico Mizrahi (machines). Around the same time, he began work on what would turned out to be a decade-long series of projects based on the work and life of French poet Paul Verlaine (1844–1896). He made two albums of his own settings of Verlaine poems with a decidedly un-retro aesthetic conceived in cooperation with Les Recycleurs de Bruits : Greaves Verlaine (2008) and Greaves Verlaine 2 (2011). In addition to his Roxongs bandmates, the album featured regular collaborators Jeanne Added (vocals) and Scott Taylor (accordion, trumpet), as well as appearances by Karen Mantler and Dominique Pifarély. Concerts promoting these albums saw Greaves accompanied by line-ups ranging from just Taylor on accordion to a full electric septet.

In 2012, Greaves embarked on yet another Verlaine project, this time composing to an original libretto by Emmanuel Tugny and teaming up with a trio of French vocalists, Elise Caron, Jeanne Added and Thomas de Pourquery. Verlaine Gisant was premiered in December 2012 at Le Triton following a residency at the venue, was subsequently performed at the Orléans Jazz Festival and at Les Sables-d'Olonnes, and a studio album was released in April 2015 on Bruno Letort's Signature label, coinciding with a live broadcast of a performance at the Maison de la Radio.

Following the death of Henry Cow bassoonist/oboist and composer Lindsay Cooper in 2013, Greaves, along with surviving members of the group and other Cooper collaborators, participated in three memorial concerts of her music in England and Italy in late 2014. Subsequently, Greaves took part in some performances by Half The Sky, a smaller ensemble formed by pianist Yumi Hara and featuring other Henry Cow alumni. Greaves has also played fully improvised sets with Fred Frith and Chris Cutler in 2019, and with the addition of Tim Hodgkinson in 2022 the resulting quartet, still performing exclusively improvised sets, has adopted the monicker Henry Now. Another improvising unit including fellow Henry Cow alumni is The Artaud Beats, formed in 2009 and consisting of Greaves, Cutler, Geoff Leigh and Yumi Hara. Greaves is also a special guest in French flautist Michel Edelin's Echoes of Henry Cow project. Greaves recites texts (mostly by Cutler) over variations on Henry Cow and Art Bears music re-interpreted by a jazz quintet which includes former collaborators Sophia Domancich, Sylvain Kassap and Simon Goubert.

In 2015, Greaves began a partnership with Italian producer Max Marchini, founder of the Dark Companion label and in charge of the revived Manticore Records label, and singer Annie Barbazza. A solo performance in May 2015 was released as Piacenza, and in 2018 a new studio album, Life Size, a mixture of new and old songs (including a cover of Matching Mole's "God Song") with guests including Zeena Parkins, Jakko Jakszyk, and Annie Barbazza. As of 2022, a follow-up is in the works along with Bestiario d'Amore, set to words by Hélène Frappat.

In early 2020, Greaves celebrated his 70th birthday with a Sunday night residency at La Gare Jazz in Paris, with a rotating line-up of many of his longtime collaborators. More recently, Les Rendez-Vous de Greaves has been the banner for regular gigs at Le Studio L'Accord Parfait, also in Paris.

Greaves has performed (bass and occasional vocals) in Folly Bololey, a reinterpretation of Robert Wyatt's Rock Bottom by the North Sea Radio Orchestra, premiered in 2014 at the Nuits de Fourvière festival, with Annie Barbazza as principal vocalist and other guests including William D. Drake (Cardiacs). A live performance in Piacenza in 2018 was released on Dark Companion the following year, and other performances followed including a live broadcast at the Maison de la Radio in Paris in December 2019.

Zones, again for Radio France's Signature label, was released in October 2022. In it, Greaves sets texts by Guillaume Apollinaire, alongside fellow vocalists Jeanne Added and Himiko Paganotti, with guitarist Olivier Mellano, another regular collaborator, in the co-producer's chair. Greaves has taken part in various projects by Mellano over the past decade, notably Ici-Bas - Les Mélodies de Gabriel Fauré with Mellano's BAUM project and various other vocalists (performed in the Cour d'Honneur at the Avignon Festival in 2018), and H'art Songs, based on Moondog's eponymous 1978 set of songs for dual pianos, percussion and five vocalists.

Private life
John Greaves presently lives in Paris with artist Laura Buxton and their two daughters, Ailsa Grace and Millie. He also has a son, Ben, from his first marriage.

Discography
 1977 – Kew. Rhone. (Virgin) (with Peter Blegvad and Lisa Herman)
 1982 – Accident (Europa)
 1984 – Parrot Fashions (Europa)
 1991 – La Petite Bouteille de Linge (La Lichère)
 1991 – greaves, cunningham (Eva) (with David Cunningham)
 1995 – Unearthed (Sub Rosa) (with Peter Blegvad)
 1995 – Songs (Resurgence)
 2001 – The Caretaker (Blueprint)
 2001 – On the Street Where You Live (Blueprint) (with Marcel Ballot and Patrice Meyer)
 2003 – The Trouble With Happiness (Harmonia Mundi)
 2004 – Chansons (Harmonia Mundi) (with Elise Caron)
 2005 – Tambien 1–7 (Resurgence)
 2008 – Greaves Verlaine (ZigZag Territoires/Harmonia Mundi)
 2012 – Greaves Verlaine 2 (Cristal/Harmonia Mundi)
 2015 – Verlaine Gisant (Signature/France Musique)
 2015 – Piacenza (Dark Companion)
 2018 – Life Size (Manticore)
 2020 – Passage Du Nord Ouest (Dark Companion)
 2022 – Zones (Signature/France Musique)

Bands 
With Henry Cow
 1973 Legend (Virgin)
 1974 Unrest (Virgin)
 1975 In Praise of Learning (Virgin)
 1975 Desperate Straights (Virgin)
 1976 Concerts (Compendium/Caroline)
 2009 The 40th Anniversary Henry Cow Box Set (Recommended)
 2019 The Henry Cow Box Redux: The Complete Henry Cow (Recommended)

With The Lodge
 1987 Smell of a Friend (Antilles)

With National Health
 1978 Of Queues and Cures (Charly)
 1982 D.S. Al Coda (Europa)
 2001 Play Time (live 1979) (Cuneiform)

With Pip Pyle and Philippe Marcel Iung
 2001 The Pig Part (Blueprint)

As guest
With Peter Blegvad
 1983 The Naked Shakespeare (Virgin)
 1985 Knights Like This (Virgin)
 1988 Downtime (Recommended)
 1995 Just Woke Up (Recommended)
 1998 Hangman's Hill (Recommended)

With Catherine Delaunay
 2011 Sois Patient Car Le Loup (Les Neuf Filles de Zeus)

With Sophia Domancich
 1991 Funerals (Gimini Music)
 2010 Snakes and Ladders (Cristal/Harmonia Mundi)

With 
 2019 Echoes of Henry Cow (RogueArt)

With Julien Lourau
 2005 Fire and Forget (Label Bleu)

With Michael Mantler
 1987 Live (Watt/ECM)
 1997 The School of Understanding (Watt/ECM)

With the North Sea Radio Orchestra
 2019 Foley Bolloly (Dark Companion)

With Michael Nyman Band
 1985 The Kiss and Other Movements (EG)

With Pip Pyle
 1998 Seven Year Itch (Voiceprint)

With Post Image
 2012 In an English Garden (Aqui Label Musique)
 
With Silvain Vanot
 2009 Bethesda (Coopérative Music/Pias)

With Robert Wyatt
 1975 Ruth Is Stranger Than Richard (Virgin)

References
Cutler, Chris, ed. (2009). The Road: Volumes 1–5 (book from The 40th Anniversary Henry Cow Box Set). Recommended Records.

Footnotes

External links
Official John Greaves website.
John Greaves biography. Calyx: The Canterbury Website.
John Greaves biography. Piano Label.
.

1950 births
Living people
People from Prestatyn
Welsh bass guitarists
Welsh composers
Welsh male composers
Canterbury scene
Henry Cow members
Alumni of Pembroke College, Cambridge
Virgin Records artists
National Health members
RogueArt artists
Progressive rock bass guitarists